El Refugio ("The Refuge") may refer to:

Places 
 El Refugio, Ahuachapán, a municipality in the Ahuachapán department of El Salvador
 El Refugio, Baja California, a city in the Tijuana municipality of Baja California, Mexico
 El Refugio, Jalisco, a town in the Tizapan El Alto municipality of Jalisco, Mexico
 El Refugio, Texas, a census-designated place (CDP) in Starr County, Texas, United States

Entertainment 
 El refugio (film), 2021 internationally co-produced film
 El refugio (TV series), Mexican telenovela
 El Refugio (de los Sueños), Argentine television series

See also 
 Refugio (disambiguation)